In operator theory, a dilation of an operator T on a Hilbert space H is an operator on a larger Hilbert space K, whose restriction  to H composed with the orthogonal projection onto H is T.

More formally, let T be a bounded operator on some Hilbert space H, and H be a subspace of a larger Hilbert space  H' . A bounded operator V on  H'  is a dilation of T if

where  is an orthogonal projection on H.

V is said to be a unitary dilation (respectively, normal, isometric, etc.) if V is unitary (respectively, normal, isometric, etc.).

Some texts impose an additional condition. Namely, that a dilation satisfy the following (calculus) property:

where f(T) is some specified functional calculus (for example, the polynomial or H∞ calculus). The utility of a dilation is that it allows the "lifting" of objects associated to T to the level of V, where the lifted objects may have nicer properties. See, for example, the commutant lifting theorem.

Applications

We can show that every contraction on Hilbert spaces has a unitary dilation. A possible construction of this dilation is as follows. For a contraction T, the operator

is positive, where the continuous functional calculus is used to define the square root. The operator DT is called the defect operator of T. Let V be the operator on

defined by the matrix

   
V is clearly a dilation of T. Also, T(I - T*T) = (I - TT*)T and a limit argument imply

Using this one can show, by calculating directly, that V is unitary, therefore a unitary dilation of T.  This operator V is sometimes called the Julia operator of T.

Notice that when T is a real scalar, say , we have

which is just the unitary matrix describing rotation by θ. For this reason, the Julia operator V(T) is sometimes called the elementary rotation of T.

We note here that in the above discussion we have not required the calculus property for a dilation. Indeed, direct calculation shows the Julia operator fails to be a "degree-2" dilation in general, i.e. it need not be true that

.

However, it can also be shown that any contraction has a unitary dilation which does have the calculus property above. This is Sz.-Nagy's dilation theorem. This generalises Sz.-Nagy's dilation theorem as all contractions have the unit disc as a spectral set.

Notes

References

.
.
.

Operator theory
Unitary operators